Samuel Lynn Hynes (August 29, 1924 – October 9, 2019) was an American author. He won a Robert F. Kennedy Book Award for The Soldiers' Tale in 1998.

Biography
Samuel Hynes was born in Chicago, Illinois. He attended the University of Minnesota and Columbia University.

Hynes served as a Marine Corps pilot from 1943 until 1946 and in 1952 and 1953. In a memoir, "Flights of Passage," Hynes explored in detail his pilot training and subsequent service in the Pacific during World War II.  He received the Distinguished Flying Cross. He also discussed his experiences as a pilot in the documentary series The War by Ken Burns (2007).  Burns interviewed Hynes again for The Vietnam War (2017), where Hynes discussed his experiences at Northwestern University during its anti-Vietnam War protests.

Hynes was a Fellow of the Royal Society of Literature and Woodrow Wilson Professor of Literature emeritus at Princeton University. His other books include On War and Writing (University of Chicago Press, 2018), A War Imagined, The Growing Seasons and The Unsubstantial Air: American Fliers in the First World War published by Farrar, Straus and Giroux in October 2014.

Family
Alex Preston (born 1979), British author and journalist, and his brother Samuel Preston (1982) lead singer of English band The Ordinary Boys, are among his grandsons.

Death
Hynes died of congestive heart failure at the age of 95 in his home in Princeton, New Jersey, on October 9, 2019.

References

1924 births
2019 deaths
Writers from Chicago
Military personnel from Illinois
United States Marine Corps pilots of World War II
Fellows of the Royal Society of Literature
Recipients of the Distinguished Flying Cross (United States)
MacDowell Colony fellows
Princeton University faculty
American male writers
University of Minnesota alumni
Columbia University alumni